Javier Luis Torrente (born 8 June 1969) is an Argentine football manager.

Career
Torrente has been assistant manager to Marcelo Bielsa at Vélez Sársfield, Espanyol, Argentina and Olympique de Marseille. He has managed Cerro Porteño and Newell's Old Boys. He resigned from Newell's after 12 months in charge in 2011. Before managing Club Nacional, Cobreloa, Once Caldas and Club León.

On 10 June 2018, he was appointed as manager of Everton de Viña del Mar, with him citing his former manager Marcelo Bielsa as a big influence of the move.

Personal life
His younger brother, Diego, is a football manager who has mainly worked as an assistant coach.

Managerial statistics

Managerial statistics

References

External links
 

1969 births
Living people
Sportspeople from Rosario, Santa Fe
Argentine football managers
Argentine expatriate football managers
Cerro Porteño managers
Coronel Bolognesi managers
Club Libertad managers
Newell's Old Boys managers
Club Nacional managers
Cobreloa managers
Once Caldas managers
Club León managers
Everton de Viña del Mar managers
Atlético Morelia managers
Deportes Antofagasta managers
Liga MX managers
Paraguayan Primera División managers
Peruvian Primera División managers
Argentine Primera División managers
Categoría Primera A managers
Chilean Primera División managers
Belgian Pro League managers
Expatriate football managers in Mexico
Argentine expatriate sportspeople in Mexico
Expatriate football managers in Spain
Argentine expatriate sportspeople in Spain
Expatriate football managers in Paraguay
Argentine expatriate sportspeople in Paraguay
Expatriate football managers in Peru
Argentine expatriate sportspeople in Peru
Expatriate football managers in Chile
Argentine expatriate sportspeople in Chile
Expatriate football managers in France
Argentine expatriate sportspeople in France
Expatriate football managers in Colombia
Argentine expatriate sportspeople in Colombia
Expatriate football managers in Belgium
Argentine expatriate sportspeople in Belgium